is a district located in Nemuro Subprefecture, Hokkaido, Japan.  As of 2004, its estimated population is 30,285 with a total area of 1309.44 km2

Nakashibetsu Airport, the easternmost airport in Japan, is located in Nakashibetsu.

Towns
Shibetsu
Nakashibetsu

History
1869 - Hokkaido divided into 11 provinces and 86 districts.  Shibetsu District placed under Nemuro Province.
April 1, 1923 - Chashikotsu Village from Notsuke District, Shibetsu Village and Ichani Village from Shibetsu District, Chuurui Village, Kunnebetsu (?) Village and Sakimui?? Village (崎無意村) from Menashi District merge to form Shibetsu Village (now Shibetsu Town) in Shibetsu District.
April 1, 1955 - Part of Betsukai Village in Notsuke District separated off to be incorporated into Nakashibetsu Town.

Districts in Hokkaido